Abul Kalam Azad Chowdhury (also AK Azad Chowdhury; born 21 October 1946) is a Bangladeshi academic. He served as the 23rd Vice-chancellor of the University of Dhaka and the 11th Chairman of University Grants Commission of Bangladesh.

Education and career
Chowdhury was born on 21 October 1946 to Siddiqur Rahman Chowdhury and Anwara Begum Chowdhury. He completed his bachelor's and master's in bio-chemistry from the University of Dhaka in 1967 and 1968 respectively. He obtained his Ph.D. in Pharmacy from the University of Manchester in 1976.

Chowdhury was a member of Drug Policy Committee of Harvard University, National Professor of Canam University of Paris, and Visiting Professor Nottingham University, UK.

Achievements 
In 2018, Chowdhury was included in the Queen's New Year's Honours list, receiving an MBE for services to Education in Bangladesh.

References

Living people
1946 births
People from Feni District
University of Dhaka alumni
Alumni of the University of Manchester
Academic staff of the University of Dhaka
Vice-Chancellors of the University of Dhaka
Fellows of Bangladesh Academy of Sciences
Honorary Fellows of Bangla Academy